"A Good Way to Get on My Bad Side" is a song recorded by American country music artists Tracy Byrd and Mark Chesnutt. It was released in March 2001 as the first single from Byrd's album Ten Rounds.  The song reached #21 on the Billboard Hot Country Singles & Tracks chart.  The song was written by Rivers Rutherford and George Teren.

Content
Tracy Byrd and Mark Chesnutt had been friends since both artists' major-label music careers began in the early 1990s. Byrd told Knight Ridder that he wanted to do a duet with Chesnutt for several years, but the opportunity for one never occurred until he found the song. He also presented it as an example of wanting to sound "different" on the corresponding album Ten Rounds, to which "A Good Way to Get on My Bad Side" served as lead single. The same publication describes the song as "toe-tapping, fast paced music" about a narrator who lists off various aspects that he finds a personal annoyance. One example listed in the last verse is a criticism of mainstream country music, wherein Byrd sings, "a little sissy in a cowboy hat ain't country".

Chart performance

References

2001 singles
2001 songs
Tracy Byrd songs
Mark Chesnutt songs
Songs written by Rivers Rutherford
Songs written by George Teren
Song recordings produced by Billy Joe Walker Jr.
RCA Records Nashville singles
Male vocal duets
Songs about country music